Lucretia is an oil-on-canvas painting by Paolo Veronese from c. 1585. The painting depicts Lucretia in the act of piercing her chest with a dagger, after having been forced to yield to the requests of Sextus Tarquinius.

A subject of many works of other artists, such as Titian, Rembrandt and Raffaello Sanzio, in Veronese's painting what is striking is the attention to detail, from the drapery that cloaks the figure to her jewels.

See also
 Lucretia

1580s paintings
Mythological paintings by Paolo Veronese
Paintings in the collection of the Kunsthistorisches Museum
Paintings of Lucretia